Anthony David Bernard Sylvester  (21 September 1924 – 19 June 2001) was a British art critic and curator. Although he received no formal education in the arts, during his long career he was influential in promoting modern artists, in particular Francis Bacon, Joan Miró, and Lucian Freud.

Life and career
Born into a north-London Jewish family, Sylvester had trouble as a student at University College School and was thrown out of the family home. He wrote for the paper Tribune and went to Paris in 1947 where he met Alberto Giacometti, one of the strongest influences on him.

Sylvester is credited with coining the term kitchen sink originally to describe a strand of post-war British painting typified by John Bratby. Sylvester used the phrase negatively but it was widely applied to other art forms including literature and theatre.

During the 1950s, Sylvester worked with Henry Moore, Freud and Bacon but also supported Richard Hamilton and the other "Young Turks" of British Pop art. This led him to become a prominent media figure in the 1960s. During the 1960s and 1970s Sylvester occupied a number of roles at the Arts Council of Great Britain serving on advisory panels and on the main panel.  He was also a trustee of the Tate Gallery, among a number of such positions. In 1969, he curated a Renoir exhibition at the Hayward Gallery for which he was assisted by a young Nicholas Serota. During the 1970s, he became interested in and collected early oriental carpets. and in 1983, he co-curated (with Donald King of the Victoria and Albert Museum) an exhibition, The Eastern Carpet in the Western World, at the Hayward Gallery.

Sylvester was awarded a Golden Lion at the 1993 Venice Biennale for curating an exhibition of Francis Bacon's work. He was married to Pamela Briddon (three daughters; marriage dissolved). He was also the father of the artist Cecily Brown with the writer Shena Mackay.

Books
 King, Donald and Sylvester, David eds. The Eastern Carpet in the Western World, From the 15th to the 17th century, Arts Council of Great Britain, London, 1983, 
 David Sylvester "Interviste con artisti americani" Castelvecchi editore, 2012

Notes

External links
 Guardian obituary June 20, 2001
 David Sylvester, 'Interviews with Francis Bacon (1963, 1966, 1979)', The Guardian, 13 September 2007
 John Tusa. 'Interview with David Sylvester', BBC Radio 3
 

1924 births
2001 deaths
Commanders of the Order of the British Empire
Commandeurs of the Ordre des Arts et des Lettres
English art critics
People educated at University College School